The 1992–93 St. Francis Terriers men's basketball team represented St. Francis College during the 1992–93 NCAA Division I men's basketball season. The team was coached by Ron Ganulin, who was in his second year at the helm of the St. Francis Terriers. The Terrier's home games were played at the  Generoso Pope Athletic Complex. The team has been a member of the Northeast Conference since 1981.

The Terriers finished their season at 9–18 overall and 8–10 in conference play.

On February 4, 1993, Ron Arnold set the Terrier record for steals in a game, 11, against Mount St. Mary's. Arnold's 11 steals are also tied for third most in NCAA history.

Roster

Schedule and results

|-
!colspan=12 style="background:#0038A8; border: 2px solid #CE1126;;color:#FFFFFF;"| Regular season
  

 

  

  

|-
!colspan=12 style="background:#0038A8; border: 2px solid #CE1126;;color:#FFFFFF;"| 1993 NEC tournament
  
|-

References

St. Francis Brooklyn Terriers men's basketball seasons
St. Francis
St. Francis Brooklyn Terriers men's basketball
St. Francis Brooklyn Terriers men's basketball